Aquitaine is a frigate in service with the French Navy. She is the lead ship of her class of French frigates, which in turn were developed by the FREMM multipurpose frigate program.

Service 
Aquitaine was developed as part of a joint Franco-Italian program known as FREMM, which was implemented to develop a new class of frigates for use by various European navies. Construction on the ship began in 2007 and was completed in 2012.  

In April 2018 Aquitaine participated in the 2018 bombing of Damascus and Homs.

References 

2010 ships
Aquitaine-class frigates
Ships built in France